Sarah Hueniken is a Canadian Alpine Guide and professional ice climber Hueniken is the first North American woman to climb an M14 rated climb.

In January 2015, Hueniken became the second person to scale the ice-covered rock wall next to the Horseshoe Falls at Niagara Falls.  She followed her partner, Canadian climber Will Gadd. Their ascent took place on Goat Island, located on the American side of the falls.

See also
Ines Papert, leading female ice climber

References

External links 
 

Canadian mountain climbers
Year of birth missing (living people)
Living people
Ice climbers
Place of birth missing (living people)
Mountain guides
Female climbers